Helen Johnson-Leipold is an American billionaire businesswoman.

Biography
She is the daughter of Samuel Curtis Johnson Jr., who died in 2004, and Imogene Powers Johnson and the great great granddaughter of S. C. Johnson & Son founder Samuel Curtis Johnson Sr. She was elected Chairman and CEO of Johnson Outdoors in March 1999, and she was elected Chairman of Johnson Financial Group in July 2004.

She began her career at Foote, Cone & Belding in Chicago in 1979 and joined S. C. Johnson & Son in September 1985. She is tied with her three siblings and mother at #182 on the Forbes 400 list of Richest Americans. Johnson-Leipold was born in Racine, Wisconsin.

Helen and her husband, Minnesota Wild owner Craig Leipold maintain residences in Racine, Wisconsin, and Saint Paul, Minnesota, and are the parents of five sons.

References

Businesspeople from Racine, Wisconsin
Cornell University alumni
Samuel Curtis Johnson family
American billionaires
American women chief executives
Living people
Year of birth missing (living people)